The two Siegessäulen is a pair of outdoor columns surmounted by bronze statues of Victoria, the goddess of victory. They were made in 1840 by the German sculptor Christian Daniel Rauch and installed in the park of Charlottenburg Palace in Berlin, Germany, in front of the west façade of the Neuer Pavillon.

See also
 1840 in art

References

1840 establishments in Germany
1840 sculptures
Bronze sculptures in Germany
Buildings and structures in Charlottenburg-Wilmersdorf
Charlottenburg
Outdoor sculptures in Berlin
Sculptures of women in Germany
Statues in Germany
Victory
Works by German people